Florent Pagny (born 6 November 1961) is a French singer-songwriter, musician and actor. He records his work in French, as well as in Italian, Spanish and English. His greatest hits include "N'importe quoi", "Savoir aimer" and "Ma Liberté de penser"—all three were number one in France. As of 2018, he has sold more than 6 million singles and 10 million albums, becoming the 17th best-selling artist of all time in France.

Early years
Florent Pagny began his artistic career as an actor in popular films and television dramas. He appeared in La Balance, L'As des as, and A Captain's Honor or Fort Saganne.

In 1987, he wrote his first song titled "N'importe quoi". Pagny's first album, Merci, was released in 1990. The album's songs, mainly written by himself, began to attract controversy, with the press eventually boycotting some of them. This led to a decline in sales, culminating in personal problems. His follow-up album, Réaliste, was also not as successful.

Jean-Jacques Goldman wrote three songs for Pagny under the pseudonym Sam Brewski, and presented to him a new staff. The album Rester vrai marked the beginning of his career as a performer only. Bienvenue chez moi, a semi-compilation released in 1995, was a smash success. Pagny also covered "Caruso", the hit originally performed by Lucio Dalla.

Pagny as a performer
He decided to move to Argentinian Patagonia to flee the French tax authorities and to start a new life with his wife, Azucena, and their children. Recently, Pagny said he had enrolled his children in Miami because he didn't want them to speak Arabic while returning from school. His next album, Savoir aimer, was released in 1997. It was composed by a number of writers, including Jean-Jacques Goldman, Erick Benzi, Jacques Veneruso, Zazie and, Pascal Obispo, who also produced the album. "Savoir aimer" turned out to be an immediate success.

In 1999, Pagny released an album of cover versions of his old song, Recréation. From "Môme Julie" to "Antisocial", he mixed musical styles and dabbled with techno arrangements.

Pagny then alternated studios and cover albums (at least in part) and regularly changed his look. In 2000, he released the album Châtelet Les Halles, whose title song was produced by Calogero. He followed that with 2, an album composed of duets released in 2001. In 2003, he returned with Ailleurs land, whose first single, "Ma Liberté de penser", was composed by Pascal Obispo and Lionel Florence and deals with Pagny's problems with the French treasury. Finally, in 2004, Pagny released Baryton, an album composed of opera songs.

In 2007, Pagny released an album of covers of songs originally composed and performed by Jacques Brel entitled Pagny chante Brel.

Discography

Albums

Studio albums

Live albums

Compilations

Singles

*Did not appear in the official Belgian Ultratop 50 charts, but rather in the bubbling under Ultratip charts.

Filmography

Awards
 Victoires de la Musique Male artist of the year (1998)

References

External links 
  Official website
  Biography of Florent Pagny, from Radio France Internationale

Living people
People from Chalon-sur-Saône
French male film actors
French male television actors
French-language singers
French pop singers
French singer-songwriters
1961 births